Alfred McEwen is a professor of planetary geology at the University of Arizona.  McEwen is a member of the Lunar and Planetary Laboratory where he directs the director of the Planetary Image Research Laboratory.  He is a member of the imaging science team on the Cassini–Huygens mission to Saturn, co-investigator on the Lunar Reconnaissance Orbit Camera team, and principal investigator of the High Resolution Imaging Science Experiment (HiRISE) aboard the Mars Reconnaissance Orbiter.

He earned a Ph.D. in Planetary Geology in 1988 from Arizona State University.

McEwen participated in the Mars Odyssey, Mars Global Surveyor, and Galileo science teams.

In 2015, McEwen received the Whipple Award for his work on HiRISE. In 2019, he received the G. K. Gilbert Award.

Bibliography

References

Living people
Astrogeologists
Arizona State University alumni
Scientific American people
Year of birth missing (living people)
Planetary scientists